= Listed buildings in Brøndby Municipality =

This is a list of listed buildings in Brøndby Municipality, Denmark.

== The list ==
Listing name	Contributing resource	Image	Location	Coordinates	Description
Kirkebjerg Allé 186	Farmhouse		Kirkebjerg Allé 186, 2605 Brøndby	55°38′45.52″N 12°24′33.26″E	
